The 1988 Enzed Sandown 500 was an endurance race for Group 3A Touring Cars. The event was held at the Sandown International Raceway in Victoria, Australia on 11 September 1988 over 129 laps of the 3.9 km circuit, a total distance of 503 km. This was the last time that the 3.9 km International configuration of the Sandown circuit was used for Australian touring car racing. The race was the 23rd running of the "Sandown enduro".

1988 would be the only year that New Zealand based hydraulic hose and connector repair company Enzed, a former sponsor of Larry Perkins, would sponsor the event.

Allan Moffat and Gregg Hansford won the race in their Eggenberger Motorsport built Ford Sierra RS500. It was Moffat's 6th and final Sandown enduro win having previously won in 1969, 1970, 1974, 1982 and 1983. It was also Moffat's final race win as a driver in Australia. Second was the new Holden VL Commodore SS Group A SV of Larry Perkins and Denny Hulme, while third after numerous troubles was the pole winning Sierra of Dick Johnson and John Bowe.

Class B was won by the Mobil 1 Racing BMW M3 of Peter Brock, Jim Richards and David Parsons which finished 7th outright, 7 laps down on the Moffat/Hansford Sierra. Class C was won by the Nissan Gazelle of David Sala and Ross Burbidge which finished 11th outright, 20 laps down on the Sierra.

The race was broadcast live throughout Australia by the ABC with commentary provided by Will Hagon, Peter Gee and Melbourne motor racing personality "Captain" Peter Janson.

Class structure
The race was contested in three displacement classes:
 Class A: Outright
 Class B: 2001 cc to 3000 cc
 Class C: Up to 2000 cc

Results

Qualifying
Grid positions were determined by three 30 minute qualifying sessions. The first ten positions were:

Race

Note: Car 13 was still running at the finish of the race but had not completed 75% of the race winners' distance.

Statistics
 Pole Position - #17 Dick Johnson - 1:46.94
 Winners' race time: 4 hrs 4 mins 11.24 sec 
 Fastest Lap - #17 John Bowe - 1:47.65 (lap 81 - new lap record)

Race name
Sources differ in referring to the race as either the Enzed Sandown 500 or simply as the Enzed 500. The former is used in the Official Program and in the Provisional Results and has been used here.

See also
1988 Australian Touring Car season

References

Further reading
 Mike Jacobson, Moffat's Sandown, Australian Auto Action, September 16, 1988, pages 10–15

External links
1988 Sandown 500 highlights - Part 1 of 4, www.youtube.com
1988 Sandown 500 highlights - Part 2 of 4, www.youtube.com
1988 Sandown 500 highlights - Part 3 of 4, www.youtube.com
1988 Sandown 500 highlights - Part 4 of 4, www.youtube.com

Motorsport at Sandown
Enzed Sandown 500
Pre-Bathurst 500